Sharp Farmhouse is a historic home located at Guilderland in Albany County, New York.  It was built around 1875 and is a two-story, "L" shaped building with Stick/Eastlake style detailing.  It features a gable roof with carved, exposed framing and a small ocular window.

It was listed on the National Register of Historic Places in 1982.

References

Houses on the National Register of Historic Places in New York (state)
Houses completed in 1875
Queen Anne architecture in New York (state)
Houses in Albany County, New York
National Register of Historic Places in Albany County, New York